Niabella hibiscisoli is a Gram-negative, strictly aerobic, rod-shaped and non-motile bacterium from the genus of Niabella which has been isolated from soil from a Rose from the Sharon garden from Daejeon in Korea.

References

External links
Type strain of Niabella hibiscisoli at BacDive -  the Bacterial Diversity Metadatabase

Chitinophagia
Bacteria described in 2017